Geinitzia may refer to:

 Geinitzia (plant), an extinct genus of conifer
 Geinitzia (insect), an extinct genus of insect

See also
 Geinitzina, a genus of single-celled organism